The diving competition at the 2018 Central American and Caribbean Games was held in Barranquilla, Colombia from 19 to 25 July at the Complejo Acuático.

Medal summary

Men's events

Women's events

Medal table

References

External links
2018 Central American and Caribbean Games – Diving 
Results book

 
2018 Central American and Caribbean Games events
Central American and Caribbean Games
2018
Diving in Colombia
Qualification tournaments for the 2019 Pan American Games